This is a list of radio stations in Europe.

Pan-European radio networks

European commercial radio networks 
 Bauer Media Group
 United Kingdom (Bauer Radio company)
 Ireland (Newstalk, Today FM, 98FM, SPIN 1038, SPIN South West)
 Norway (Radio Norge, Kiss, Radio Norsk Pop, Radio Topp 40, Radio Rock, Radio Vinyl, P24/7 MIX, P24/7 FUN, P24/7 KOS)
 Denmark (Nova, The Voice, Radio 100, My Rock, Radio Soft, Pop FM, Mix 7, Planet Rock, Radio Vinyl, Pop FM 80'er)
 Sweden (Mix Megapol, NRJ Sweden, Rock Klassiker, Svensk Pop, Vinyl FM, Radio Disney, Radio Nostalgie Sweden, Lugna Klassiker, Rock Klassiker Hardrock, Gold FM, Radio Active, Relax FM, Retro FM, Topp 40)
 Finland (Radio Nova, Iskelma, Radio City, NRJ Finland, Radio Nostalgie Finland, Basso, Suomi Rock, Suomi Rap, Top 51, Kasari, Radio Pooki, Radio Classic, Kiss, Ysari, local stations (Radio 957, Radio Pori, Auran Aallot))
 Poland (RMF FM, RMF24, RMF MAXX, RMF Classic)
 Slovakia (Radio Express, Evropa 2 Slovakia, Radio Melody)
 Portugal (Radio Comercial, M80 Radio, Cidade FM, Vodafone FM, Smooth FM)
 NRJ Group
 NRJ / Energy – in France, Germany, Switzerland, Austria, Belgium, Norway, Denmark, Sweden, Finland, Ukraine, Bulgaria, Georgia, Cyprus, Lebanon, Morocco, Egypt and Russia
 Nostalgie – in France, Belgium, Switzerland, Germany, Sweden, Finland and Lebanon
 Chérie FM – in France and Belgium
 Virgin Radio – in Canada, UK, Switzerland, Italy, Romania, Turkey, Lebanon, UAE and Oman
 Radio Monte Carlo (RMC) – in France, Italy, Georgia, Kazakhstan, Russia
 RTL Group
 Germany (RTL Radio and local radio stations)
 Luxembourg (RTL Radio Lёtzebuerg, RTL Radio, Eldoradio, L'essentiel Radio, RTL Gold)
 France (RTL, RTL2, Fun Radio)
 Spain (Onda Cero, Europa FM, Melodia FM)
 Czech Media Invest
 Czech Republic (Evropa 2, Frekvence 1, Dance Radio, Radio Bonton, Radio Z)
 Romania (Europa FM, Virgin Radio Romania, Vibe FM, Smart FM)
TV3 Group
 Estonia (Star FM, Power Hit Radio, Radio Volna)
 Latvia (Star FM, TOP Radio)
 Lithuania (Power Hit Radio)
 Viaplay Group
 Sweden (Rix FM, Star FM, Bandit Rock, Lugna Favoriter, Bandit Classic Rock, Dansbands Kanalen, Gamla Favoriter, Go Country, HitMix 90's, Power Hit Radio, Rix FM Fresh, Svenska Favoriter)
 Norway (P4 Hele Norge, P5 Hits, P6 Rock, P7 Klem, P8 Pop, P9 Retro, P10 Country, P11 Bandit, NRJ Norway)
 Antenna Group
 Greece (Easy 97.2, Rythmos 94.9)
 Romania (Kiss FM, Magic FM, One FM, Rock FM)
 United Group
 Radio stations in Bulgaria (Nova News, The Voice, Magic FM, Radio Vitosha, Radio Veselina)
 Internet-radio in Serbia (Radio Nova S)
 Central European Media Enterprises
 Radio stations in Bulgaria (bTV Radio, N-JOY, Z-Rock, Classic FM, Jazz FM)
 Gazprom-Media
 Avtoradio – Russia, Latvia (Riga and Kraslava), Ukraine, Moldova (Cishinau), Armenia (Yerevan), Kyrgyzstan (Bishkek), Tajikistan (Dushanbe)
 Yumor FM – Russia, Estonia, Belarus and Kazakhstan
 TNT Music Radio – in Bishkek (Kyrgyzstan)
 SAFMAR Media (Krutoy Media)
 Love Radio – in Russia, Moldova (Cishinau), Kazakhstan, Bishkek (Kyrgyzstan) and Dushande (Tajikistan)
 Radio Dacha – in Russia and Kazakhstan
 Radio Shanson  – in Russia, Ukraine and Yerevan (Armenia)
 Radio Russian Hits – in Russia and Moldova (Cishinau)
 European Media Group
 Europa Plus – Russia, Belarus (Miensk and Vitsebsk region), Ukraine (Kyiv and Dnipro), Moldova (Cishinau), Yerevan (Armenia), Kazakhstan, Kyrgyzstan, Dushanbe (Tajikistan)
 Retro FM – Russia, Latvia, Belarus (Miensk, Vitsebsk and Polatsk), Moldova (Cishinau), Kazakhstan, Kyrgyzstan
 Novoe Radio – Russia, Moldova and Dushanbe (Tajikistan)
 Radio 7 – Russia and Moldova
 Eldoradio – Saint-Petersburg (Russia) and Almaty (Kazakhstan)
 Studio 21 – Bishkek (Kyrgyzstan)
 Russian Media Group
 Russkoe Radio – Russia, Belarus (Miensk, Babruisk and Mahilou), Cyprus, Armenia (Yerevan), Kazakhstan
 DFM – Russia and Estonia
 Hit FM – Russia and Bishkek (Kyrgyzstan)
 Radio Monte Carlo – Russia and Almaty (Kazakhstan)
 News UK
 United Kingdom (TalkSport, TalkRadio, Times Radio, Virgin Radio UK)
 Wireless Ireland (Dublin (Dublin's Q102 and FM104), Cork (Cork's 96FM and C103), Live95 Limerick, LMFM Drogheda, U105 Belfast)

 European Hit Radio (EHR) – in Latvia and Lithuania
 Lux FM – in Ukraine and Kazakhstan
 Lindin – in Iceland and the Faroe Islands
Radio S1 – in Serbia, Bosnia and Herzegovina and Montenegro
 Play Radio – in Serbia (formerly Radio B92) and Montenegro (formerly Prva Radio)
 Radio Record – in Russia, Moldova and Bishkek (Kyrgyzstan)
 Radio MIR – in Russia, Yerevan (Armenia) and Bishkek (Kyrgyzstan)
 Antenne Bayern Group
 Germany (Antenne Bayern, Rock Antenne, Antenne NRW, Oldie Antenne)
 Austria (Rock Antenne Österreich)
Klassik Radio – in Germany and Austria

Religious broadcasters 
 Adventist World Radio – on MW and SW
  (ERF) – in Germany, Austria, Switzerland
 European Gospel Radio – on MW and SW
 Radio Maria – on FM in Albania, Austria, Bosnia and Herzegovina, Croatia, Germany (Radio Horeb), Hungary, Italy (+German in South Tirol), Kosovo, Latvia, Lithuania, Malta, Monaco, North Macedonia (Strumica), Portugal, Romania (in Romanian and Hungarian), Serbia (in Serbian and Hungarian), Slovakia (in Hungarian), Spain, Ukraine (on UKV). On DAB+ in Austria, Belgium (Flanders), Slovakia (in Slovakian), Switzerland (in German and French), The Netherlands, United Kingdom, Ukraine. On digital in Belarus and Ireland.
  (RCF) – in France, Belgium and Switzerland
 Trans World Radio – on MW and SW

Others 
 Euranet – European radio network
 European Radio for Belarus
 Radio Free Europe/Radio Liberty – on FM and MW

Lists of stations

By language 
 List of Catalan-language radio stations
 List of Danish-language radio stations
 List of German-language radio stations
 List of Hungarian-language radio stations
 List of Irish-language radio stations
 List of Italian-language radio stations
 List of Norwegian-language radio stations
 List of Polish-language radio stations
 List of Russian-language radio stations

By country

Sovereign states 
 List of radio stations in Albania
 List of radio stations in Andorra
 List of radio stations in Armenia
 List of radio stations in Austria and Liechtenstein
 List of radio stations in Azerbaijan
 List of radio stations in Belarus
 List of radio stations in Belgium
 List of radio stations in Bosnia and Herzegovina
 List of radio stations in Bulgaria
 List of radio stations in Croatia
 List of radio stations in Cyprus
 List of radio stations in the Czech Republic
 List of radio stations in Denmark
 List of radio stations in Estonia
 List of radio stations in Finland
 List of radio stations in France
 List of radio stations in Germany
 List of radio stations in Georgia (country)
 List of radio stations in Greece
 List of radio stations in Hungary
 List of radio stations in Iceland
 List of radio stations in the Republic of Ireland
 List of radio stations in Italy
 List of radio stations in Kazakhstan
 List of radio stations in Latvia
 List of radio stations in Lithuania
 List of radio stations in Luxembourg
 List of radio stations in Malta
 List of radio stations in Moldova
 List of radio stations in Monaco
 List of radio stations in Montenegro
 List of radio stations in the Netherlands
 List of radio stations in North Macedonia
 List of radio stations in Norway
 List of radio stations in Poland
 List of radio stations in Portugal
 List of radio stations in Romania
 List of radio stations in Russia
 List of radio stations in San Marino
 List of radio stations in Serbia
 List of radio stations in Slovenia
 List of radio stations in Slovakia
 List of radio stations in Spain
 List of radio stations in Sweden
 List of radio stations in Switzerland
 List of radio stations in Turkey
 List of radio stations in Ukraine
 List of radio stations in the United Kingdom

States with limited recognition 
 List of radio stations in Abkhazia
 List of radio stations in Kosovo
 List of radio stations in Nagorno-Karabakh
 List of radio stations in Northern Cyprus
 List of radio stations in South Ossetia
 List of radio stations in Transnistria

Radio stations in major cities 
 List of radio stations in Naples
 List of radio stations in Paris, today and historically
 List of radio stations in Rome
 List of radio stations in Turin
 List of radio stations in Kyiv

See also 
 Lists of radio stations in Africa
 Lists of radio stations in the Americas
 Lists of radio stations in Asia
 Lists of radio stations in Oceania

References

External links 

 Radiomap.eu Radio stations in Europe
 FMSCAN reception prediction of FM, TV, MW, SW stations (also use the expert options for better results)
 FMLIST provides detailed listings of FM stations from all countries in Europe
 MWLIST worldwide database of MW and LW stations
 Radiostationworld.com - Broadcasting in Europe
 Radio Stations in Europe List of European radio stations by country
 TvRadioCat List of European radio stations
 Eurohit.net European online radio stations

Radio stations